Abbondanzieri is a surname. Notable people with the surname include:

Marisa Abbondanzieri (born 1956), Italian politician
Roberto Abbondanzieri (born 1972), Argentine footballer

Italian-language surnames